Archbishop Ivan Rafael Rodić, O.F.M. (also , ; June 15, 1870 – May 10, 1954) was a Croatian Franciscan prelate, who served as the first Archbishop of the Roman Catholic Archdiocese of Belgrade-Smederevo between 1924 and 1936.

Biography
Rodić was born on June 15, 1870 in the village of Nurkovac, at the time in the Kingdom of Croatia-Slavonia. As a Franciscan, he graduated from the Vienna University of Theology and started teaching theology in Baja, Hungary in 1893, where he remained until 1898.

He became the Abbot of the Franciscan monastery in Vienna, and the provincial minister of several monasteries in Croatia. Between 1881 and 1884, he was the provincial of the Province of St. John of Capistrano that included Slavonia, Syrmia and much of southern Hungary. In 1884, Rodić in his capacity as provincial declined the request of Ivan Antunović to help start a newspaper for the Bunjevci Croats in Bačka, fearing opposition from higher authorities, but supported his cause - using their native language and relaying them news from Croatia. Antunović did nevertheless manage to start the newspaper, Neven, and eventually in 1909 Rodić contributed several articles to it.

He later served as the visitor general of the Order, travelling to numerous monasteries in Europe and America.

On February 10, 1923 Rodić became the apostolic administrator of the newly created Diocese of Banat and moved to Veliki Bečkerek (today Zrenjanin, Serbia). The following year, on October 29, 1924 he was named the archbishop of Belgrade-Smederevo.

On November 28, 1936, he was replaced as an archbishop of Belgrade and instead became the titular archbishop of Philippopolis in Thracia. He died on May 10, 1954 in Požega.

References

1870 births
1954 deaths
Franciscan bishops
20th-century Roman Catholic archbishops in Serbia
Croatian Franciscans